Anil Kumar Sinha is a Justice of the Supreme Court of Nepal. He was appointed by the President of Nepal on the recommendation of the Judicial Council of Nepal on 1 August 2016.

Early life 
Mr. Sinha was born on October 31, 1958 in Nepal.

Education 
Sinha received a graduate degree in Law from Nepal Law Campus, Tribhuvan University, Nepal in 1982.

Career 
Sinha was recognized as an advocate the year of his graduation (1982) and was honored by the Supreme Court as a Senior Advocate in 2013. During a professional career as an advocate lasting 34 years, he dedicated most of his time in Business Law, mainly Contracts and Commercial Arbitration, Taxation, Company Law, Foreign Investments, Banking and Insurance Law, etc.

References

Living people
Justices of the Supreme Court of Nepal
1958 births